The Government of Dubai is the subnational authority that governs the Emirate of Dubai, one of the seven constituent monarchies which make up the United Arab Emirates. The executive authority and head of the government is the Ruler of Dubai, Sheikh Mohammed bin Rashid Al Maktoum. The Ruler of Dubai appoints the Dubai Executive Council, which is led by the Crown prince of Dubai and is responsible for the day-to-day management of Dubai Government agencies such as the Dubai Municipality and numerous other governing entities.

History 
Since 1830, the Emirate of Dubai had a semi-autonomous government led by the Ruler of Dubai, who would delegate responsibilities of managing the affairs of the emirate to representatives in an informal government. Prior to the unification of the United Arab Emirates, Dubai had already started issuing local laws as part of the Trucial States on matters of taxation and trade, allowing the emirate to attract foreign trade and develop its fishing and pearling industry.

Following the unification of the United Arab Emirates and the establishment of the federal government of the UAE in 1971, the Emirate of Dubai maintained autonomy for various domestic affairs including education, transportation, economic affairs, and security with its own police force unlike other northern emirates that relied on federal ministries.

On February 24, 2003,   was issued by the Ruler of Dubai establishing the Dubai Executive Council as a legislative council to support the Ruler of Dubai in his duties and exercising some of his responsibilities, with the head of the council and the deputies to be appointed by the Ruler and the remaining seats to be distributed to other members, usually heads of major Dubai Government departments such as the heads of Dubai Municipality and the Dubai Police Force.

Organisation 
The Ruler of Dubai is the absolute monarch of the Emirate of Dubai and has the sole authority to issue decrees establishing governmental departments, issuing and amending laws and is the head of government. The Ruler of Dubai has since 2003 designated some responsibility of overseeing the Dubai Governmental departments to the Dubai Executive Council which is tasked with supervising governmental departments, preparing the yearly budget, issuing certain Executive Decrees, and reporting to the Ruler of Dubai on a regular basis.

Dubai Government departments or agencies are formed by royal decree, such as the decree to form the Dubai Police Force in 1956 and then generally added to the responsibilities of the Dubai Executive Council. In 2022, the Dubai Government has 58 governmental departments under the supervision of the Dubai Executive Council.

Dubai Executive Council 
Following its formation in 2003, the Dubai Executive Council has become the legislative arm of the Dubai Government, enforcing royal decrees issued by the Ruler of Dubai into governmental regulations and policies and facilitating intra-governmental communication.  stipulates the council to be organised into a Chairman of the Council who is appointed by royal decree and members of the council, appointed on the advice of the Chairman of the council by the Ruler of Dubai. Law 3 of 2003 allows any individual to become a member of the council, irrespective of whether they lead a governmental department or entity but requires the heads of 14 departments to be members, such as Dubai Municipality and Dubai Police Force.

As of July 2022, the Dubai Executive Council has 22 members including the Chairman of the council, which has been led by the Crown Prince of Dubai Hamdan bin Mohammed Al Maktoum since September 2006. The remaining members include:

First Lady of Dubai 
First Lady of Dubai is the name given to the senior wife and consort to the ruler of Dubai. The first lady is the chief matriarch and is expected to represent Dubai in elegance and demeanor. The current first lady is Sheikha Hind, wife of Sheikh Mohammed bin Rashid Al Maktoum.

The position of first lady carries official duties by helping the sheikh as well as inaugurating various charities. One of the charities that Sheikha Hind is affiliated with is the UAE foodbank—she is the chairperson of the charity. Nonetheless, the first lady attends many official ceremonies and functions of state either along with or in place of the emir. They also organise events and civic programs, and typically get involved in different social causes.

See also

 Al Maktoum, the ruling family of Dubai
 Politics of the United Arab Emirates

References

External links
 

 
Dubai